Bloom Magazine is a bimonthly culture and lifestyle magazine published in Bloomington, Indiana. Founded in 2005 by editor and publisher Malcolm Abrams, Bloom is an independent, free magazine with 12,000 copies available throughout the Bloomington area. Each issue highlights various community members, places, and events and includes stories on arts, entertainment, food and wine, fashion and shopping, health and fitness, home and family, community, and business and finance.

References

External links 
 

Bimonthly magazines published in the United States
Lifestyle magazines published in the United States
Local interest magazines published in the United States
Free magazines
Independent magazines
Magazines established in 2005
Magazines published in Indiana
Bloomington, Indiana
Monroe County, Indiana